Frank Klausen (30 June 1960 – 9 February 2005) was a Danish footballer who played as a defender for Odense Boldklub. He made four appearances for the Denmark national team in 1983.

References

External links
 
 

1960 births
2005 deaths
Footballers from Odense
Danish men's footballers
Association football defenders
Denmark international footballers
Denmark youth international footballers
Odense Boldklub players